Abd al-Aziz al-Fishtali (15491621), fully Abu Faris 'Abd al-'Aziz ibn Muhammad ibn Ibrahim al-Sanhaji al-Fishtali was a Moroccan writer, head of the chancery (wazīr al-ḳalam al-aʿlā), official historiographer and official poet of the Sultan Ahmad al-Mansur.

Biography 
Abd al-Aziz was a member of the Fishtala tribe, a Berber Sanhaja tribe situated north of the city of Fez. He studied under teachers such as Abu al-Abbas al-Manjur, al-Humaydi and al-Zammuri. He composed most of the pieces of verse which were engraved, on marble or wood, on the façades and inside the pavilions of the El Badii Palace in Marrakech. His friend and biographer, the historian al-Maqqari, recognized in him the greatest poet of his time and reported that the Moroccan sultan, Ahmad al-Mansur, said: "al-Fishtali made us more illustrious than all the other princes of the earth. We can compare him to Lisan ed-Din Ibn al-Khatib."

Works 
al-Fishtali wrote 69 poems, numbering 1016 verses.

Some of his works are:

 Manahil al-safa fi ma'athir mawalina al-shurafa, the one surviving work of al-Fishtali, as the chief scribe of al-Mansur's state. It is considered to be the main source of information for the dynasty of Ahmad al-Mansur. 
 Tartīb Dīwān al-Mutanabbī 
 Madad al-Jaysh, a postscript for Ibn al-Khatib's Jaysh al-tawshīḥ

References

1549 births
1621 deaths
16th-century Berber people
17th-century Berber people
16th-century Moroccan poets
17th-century Moroccan poets
16th-century Moroccan historians
17th-century Moroccan historians
Berber historians
Berber poets
People from Marrakesh
Saadi dynasty
Sanhaja